The 1996 Major League Soccer Supplemental Draft was held on March 4, 1996, in Fort Lauderdale, Florida.

History
As Major League Soccer prepared for its first season, the league began stocking teams with players. As the teams were being created at the same time, the league adopted a measured approach to building rosters. First, the league allocated four "big name" players to each team. Then on February 6 and 7, 1996, the league held its 1996 MLS Inaugural Player Draft. Over sixteen rounds, teams selected players from any source. Then on March 4, the league held a three-round 1996 MLS College Draft. The 1996 MLS Supplemental Draft was held later the same day.

Round 1

Round 1 trades

Round 2

Round 2 trades

Round 3

Round 3 trades

References

Major League Soccer drafts
Supplemental Draft
MLS Supplemental Draft
Soccer in Florida
Sports in Fort Lauderdale, Florida
Events in Fort Lauderdale, Florida
MLS Supplemental Draft